Athrips rutjani is a moth of the family Gelechiidae. It is found in Kyrgyzstan.

The wingspan is 10.5–12.5 mm. The forewings are greyish light with a yellowish white fascia at one-fourth and a diffuse yellow spot in the middle. The base, costal and posterior margins from the base to three-fourths are black greyish and there is a distinct dark spot at three-fourths of the posterior margin. The hindwings are grey. Adults are on wing in early May.

References

Moths described in 2005
Athrips
Moths of Asia